John Auchanbolt McDougal  (May 21, 1874 – October 2, 1910) was a 19th-century Major League Baseball pitcher. He pitched in one game for the Brooklyn Grooms in the 1895 season and five games for the St. Louis Cardinals during the 1905 season.

External links

1874 births
1910 deaths
19th-century baseball players
Baseball players from Buffalo, New York
Major League Baseball pitchers
Brooklyn Grooms players
St. Louis Cardinals players
Troy Trojans (minor league) players
Springfield Ponies players
Toronto Canucks players
Taunton Herrings players
Manchester Manchesters players
Oswego Pioneers players
Cortland Wagonmakers players
Amsterdam-Gloversville-Johnstown Jags players
Amsterdam-Gloversville-Johnstown Hyphens players
Schenectady Frog Alleys players
Schenectady Electricians players
Scranton Miners players
Johnstown Johnnies players
Wilkes-Barre Barons (baseball) players
Burials at Forest Lawn Cemetery (Buffalo)